George William Frederick Brudenell-Bruce, 2nd Marquess of Ailesbury  (20 November 1804 – 6 January 1878), styled Lord Bruce between 1814 and 1821 and Earl Bruce between 1821 and 1856, was a British peer, Liberal politician and courtier.

Background and education
Born in Lower Grosvenor Street, London, Bruce was the oldest son of Charles Brudenell-Bruce, 1st Marquess of Ailesbury, and his first wife the Hon. Henrietta Hill, oldest daughter of Noel Hill, 1st Baron Berwick. He was the brother of Ernest Brudenell-Bruce, 3rd Marquess of Ailesbury, and the half-brother of Lord Charles Brudenell-Bruce. He was baptised at St George's, Hanover Square, with King George III and Queen Charlotte as his godparents. He was educated at Eton College and Christ Church, Oxford. In 1856, he succeeded to his father's titles and, in 1868, to those of his distant cousin James Brudenell, 7th Earl of Cardigan.

Career
Bruce entered the British House of Commons in 1826, representing Marlborough as Member of Parliament (MP) until 1829. In 1838, he was summoned to the House of Lords through a writ of acceleration in his father's subsidiary title Baron Bruce. He was appointed Yeomanry Aide to Queen Victoria in 1857 and was invested as a Privy Counsellor in 1859. Ailesbury held political office under Lord Palmerston and Lord Russell as Master of the Horse between 1859 and 1866. Having previously been a Deputy Lieutenant, he became Lord Lieutenant of Wiltshire in 1863. On 25 May 1864, he was invested as a Knight of the Garter. He was once again Master of the Horse, this time under William Ewart Gladstone, between 1868 and 1874.

Family
On 11 May 1837, Lord Ailesbury married Lady Mary Herbert, third daughter of George Herbert, 11th Earl of Pembroke, in the same church where he was baptised. Brudenell-Bruce died in 1878, aged 73, at Lockeridge House, near Marlborough, Wiltshire, and was buried there. Because he had no issue, his titles were inherited by his younger brother, Ernest Brudenell-Bruce. The Marchioness of Ailesbury died at 78 Pall Mall, London, in January 1892, aged 78.

References

External links
 
 

1804 births
1878 deaths
People educated at Eton College
Alumni of Christ Church, Oxford
Deputy Lieutenants of Wiltshire
Knights of the Garter
Lord-Lieutenants of Wiltshire
Bruce, George Brudenell-Bruce, Earl
Bruce, George Brudenell-Bruce, Earl
Ailesbury, M2
George
Earls of Cardigan
Members of the Privy Council of the United Kingdom
2